Jorge Camilo Castiblanco Cubides (born 24 November 1988) is a Colombian road racing cyclist, who currently rides for UCI Continental team .

Major results

2009
 8th Overall Vuelta a Bolivia
2010
 5th Overall Tour of Szeklerland
2011
 Vuelta Ciclista Chiapas
1st Points classification
1st Stage 1
 7th Overall Vuelta a Bolivia
2013
 4th Time trial, National Road Championships
 4th Overall Tour do Rio
1st Stage 3
2014
 1st Stage 1 (TTT) Vuelta a Colombia
2018
 4th Overall Tour of Thailand

References

External links

1988 births
Living people
People from Cundinamarca Department
Colombian male cyclists
20th-century Colombian people
21st-century Colombian people